Carex cumulata, common names clustered sedge, piled sedge, and piled-up sedge is a species of Carex native to North America. It is a perennial.

Conservation status within the United States
It is listed as endangered in Indiana and New Jersey, as threatened in Connecticut. New Hampshire, and New York (state), and as a special concern species in Rhode Island.

References

cumulata
Flora of North America